The Stuttering Foundation of America provides free online resources, services and support to those who stutter and their families, as well as support for research into the causes of stuttering. A 501(c)(3) nonprofit organization, The Stuttering Foundation was established by Malcolm Fraser, the co-founder of Genuine Parts Company, in 1947 in Memphis, Tennessee.  The Stuttering Foundation provides a toll-free helpline, free printed and online resources including books, pamphlets, videos, posters, referral services, support and information for people who stutter and their families, and research into the causes of stuttering.

Today, Malcolm Fraser's daughter, Jane Fraser, is president of the Foundation. In 2007, Fraser was named the Nonprofit Executive of the Year by The NonProfit Times.  The Foundation sponsors educational conferences, workshops and symposia, and week-long intensive training workshops for speech-language pathologists.

History
In 1947, Malcolm Fraser, a young man from Memphis, Tennessee, knew about stuttering from personal, often painful experience. He decided to do what he could to help others who stutter, and met with one of the foremost authorities of the day, Dr. Charles Van Riper, to discuss founding a nonprofit charitable organization.
The organization Fraser founded became today's Stuttering Foundation of America. Its goal was to provide the best and most up-to-date information and help available for the prevention of stuttering in young children and the most effective treatment available for teenagers and adults.
Today, the Foundation dedicates itself to the contemporary concerns of all those who stutter.

Founder
Malcolm Fraser knew from personal experience what the person who stutters is up against. His introduction to stuttering corrective procedures first came at the age of fifteen under the direction of Frederick Martin, M.D., who at that time was Superintendent of Speech Correction for the New York City schools.
A few years later, he worked with J. Stanley Smith, L.L.D., a stutterer and philanthropist, who, for altruistic reasons, founded the Kingsley Clubs in Philadelphia and New York that were named after the English author Charles Kingsley, who also stuttered.
The Kingsley Clubs were small groups of adult stutterers who met one night a week to try out treatment ideas then in effect. In fact, they were actually practicing group therapy as they talked about their experiences and exchanged ideas. This exchange gave each of the members a better understanding of the problem. The founder often led the discussions at both clubs.
In 1928 he joined his older brother Carlyle, who founded the NAPA Genuine Parts Company that year in Atlanta, Georgia. Malcolm Fraser became an important leader in the company and was particularly outstanding in training others for leadership roles.
In 1947, with a successful career under way, he founded the Stuttering Foundation of America. In subsequent years, he generously added $20 million to the endowment so that at the present time, endowment income covers over fifty percent of the operating budget.
In 1989, Hamilton College, Clinton, New York, presented Fraser with the honorary degree of Doctor of Humane Letters for his outstanding work on behalf of those who stutter. Malcolm Fraser was honored posthumously with the Charles Van Riper Award, presented by actor James Earl Jones at the 16th annual NCCD Awards Ceremony in Washington, D.C., September 1997. Established by the American Speech-Language-Hearing Association in 1995, the Van Riper Award was given to Fraser for his outstanding commitment to people who stutter.

Research
The Foundation is turning its attention more and more to basic research in an effort to improve early detection and develop better therapies:

Brain Research
Neuroimaging studies have greatly enhanced the potential to understand brain-behavior relationships in complex behaviors such as speech and language. Recent studies by Anne Foundas, M.D., Department of Neurology, LSU Health Sciences Center New Orleans, reveal evidence that anatomic anomalies may play a role in stuttering.

Genetic Research
Finding the genes involved in stuttering holds the promise of revealing some of the underlying causes of stuttering. The Foundation is actively involved in projects by Dr. Dennis Drayna of the National Institute on Deafness and other Communicative Disorders searching for genetic markers. In February 2010, Drayna's research team identified the first three genes for stuttering.

Education
From its inception, one of the primary goals of the Foundation has been to discuss and attempt to resolve the many questions surrounding stuttering. Through the years, the Foundation has met this challenge through a variety of educational meetings, seminars and resources, including:
 Week-long meetings during which experts in the field create films and books.
 New technologies are being pursued for more interactive media to help both clinicians and those who stutter.
 Symposia to educate professionals and to focus on a specific topic such as working with the school-age child.
 Week-long intensive training workshops for speech language pathologists. These programs are co-sponsored by leading universities throughout the U.S. and abroad.
 The Foundation's collection of books, DVDs, and brochures bring together current information and cover every phase of this complex disorder.

Global Outreach
In an alliance to help children who stutter through research, treatment and training programs, the Stuttering Foundation and the Michael Palin Centre for Stammering Children joined forces in 2006. 
The Michael Palin Centre based in London is widely considered one of the premier treatment centers in the world for childhood stuttering.

Public Awareness
An extensive public awareness campaign helps dispel misconceptions about stuttering, advises the public that help is available, offers that help, and focuses attention on the latest research.
Press releases have resulted in thousands of stories in print and segments on stuttering in the broadcast media, including CBS This Morning, The Today Show, CNN, NPR, and AP wire stories. These in turn generate thousands of calls from people seeking help.
Public service announcements and advertisements featuring nationally recognized spokespersons reach millions each year through the generosity of national, regional and local magazines, radio and television stations.
Web sites in English and Spanish contain information for the general public as well as specific help for those who stutter. The Foundation's toll-free line is accessed by more than 20,000 callers each year.

Honors and awards
The Foundation's work has been widely recognized. The American Speech-Language-Hearing Association gave its highest award, the Distinguished Service Award, to the Foundation for its "dedication and effective contributions to the field of speech pathology." In 1984, Malcolm Fraser received the fourth annual National Council on Communicative Disorders Distinguished Service Award. The NCCD, a council of 32 national organizations, recognized the Foundation's efforts in "adding to stutterers, parents, clinicians, and the public's awareness and ability to deal constructively with stuttering."

President Jane Fraser was recognized by her alma mater with the Centennial Distinguished Alumni Lifetime Achievement Award for her efforts on behalf of those who stutter.
Jane Fraser also received the prestigious Outstanding Contribution Award during the International Stuttering Association World Congress in Dubrovnik, Croatia, on May 9, 2007. In presenting the award to Fraser, Melvin Hoffman of ISA said, "No one has done more to further the cause of helping those who stutter."
Fraser was also named Nonprofit Executive of the Year by The NonProfit Times in 2008.

References

Organizations based in Memphis, Tennessee
Stuttering associations
Organizations established in 1977
Non-profit organizations based in Tennessee